Harris Academy Chafford Hundred (formerly Chafford Hundred Campus Business and Enterprise College) is a secondary school and sixth form with academy status located in Chafford Hundred in the borough of Thurrock within the commuter belt of London, England, United Kingdom.  The building was designed by Nicholas Hare Architects. Previously a comprehensive school, it became an academy on 1 October 2011.

Harris Academy Chafford Hundred is closely linked to Harris Primary Chafford Hundred, Harris Mayflower, and the newer Harris Academy Riverside and Harris Academy Ockendon, sharing executive principals and teaching staff. Before the Riverside building was completed in 2019, Chafford Hundred hosted the establishing school.

History 
In June 2000, with a budget of £10 million and under the direction of Thurrock Council as part of the Building Schools for the Future programme, work began on the site for Chafford Hundred Campus Secondary School and Chafford Hundred Primary School. A month later the then-secretary of state for education and skills, Estelle Morris, attended its groundbreaking event as its host. During the event she compared the future schools to Stantonbury Campus and Countesthorpe Community College, stating that they "would be the Stantonbury or Countesthorpe of 2001." The Chafford Hundred schools' headteachers, Alison Banks and Catherin Finn, were appointed in September 2000. Both schools opened on 1 September 2001, after which the headteachers began to cooperate with the intention to merge both schools by 2004. They shared the same site and operated de facto as a unified all-through school under the name Chafford Hundred Campus Schools. They shared teachers, the same system of governance and a senior leadership team. Alison Banks and Catherine Finn became co-headteachers, presiding over the secondary and primary school respectively. They acted as each other's deputy in these schools. Finn left in 2002 but Banks remained and continued to serve with two more co-heads.

Banks visualised a "school for the future" that would be the centre of the new Chafford Hundred settlement, and utilised the schools' modern site and unestablished history to work towards this goal. She modified the secondary school's curriculum to follow a framework for the 21st century set by the Royal Society of Arts, calling for the abolition of school subjects and the transition from an "information-led" curriculum to a "competence-led" one. Other measures included a unified faculty for all staff regardless of their specialist year group or would-be subject department, no house system (which was present in most other English schools), individual tuition for pupils and a wireless laptop for every pupil.

In 2003 the primary and secondary schools officially federated and began to share the same board of governors. The secondary school had its first evaluation by government education inspectorate Ofsted in May. It was found to have secured a "satisfactory" grade, meaning that it had underachieved. The primary school had already been inspected and was also found to be satisfactory. Headteacher Alison Banks left in 2004, later founding Westminster Academy and becoming its headteacher. She was succeeded by Christopher Tomlinson, who was the secondary school's first headteacher after it separated from the primary school and reopened in 2005. By 2006 the school was named Chafford Hundred Campus School and had become a specialist Business and Enterprise College.

In 2007 Ofsted inspected Chafford Hundred Campus School and found it to be "performing significantly less well than in all the circumstances it could reasonably be expected to perform." Ofsted gave the school an "inadequate" grade as a result. It was given a year to improve or else it would be placed into special measures and be threatened with closure. Ofsted returned in January 2008, by which time the school had changed its name to Chafford Hundred Campus Business and Enterprise College and gained an additional maths specialism. Ofsted found the school to be "making satisfactory progress in addressing the issues for improvement" and graded the school as "good" five months later. Improvements continued and the school was designated as a high performing specialist school in 2009, gaining specialist status in Applied Learning as a result. It was recognised as the "most improved school in England" by the Department for Children, Schools and Families in January 2010, with the number of students passing their GCSEs rising from 16% to 62% over a three-year period.

In January 2011, the Department for Education appointed Christopher Tomlinson executive headteacher of Eltham Foundation School, a position which he also gained at Chafford Hundred. Eltham improved in a similar manner to Chafford Hundred soon after, being recognised by the department as the "most improved secondary school in the country ever". Chafford Hundred Campus and its adjacent primary school jointly underwent academisation in October 2011, becoming members of the Harris Federation. Chafford Hundred Campus was renamed Harris Academy Chafford Hundred to reflect this. The school retained specialist status in Business and Enterprise and Applied Learning but abandoned its maths specialism, instead gaining a new specialism in gifted and talented education. Its first inspection as an academy was held in November 2011, resulting in an overall Ofsted grade of "outstanding". Nicola Graham was appointed head of school in 2012, serving under Christopher Tomlinson's executive leadership. Eltham Foundation School joined the Harris Federation later that year, becoming Harris Academy Greenwich.

In 2014 Christopher Tomlinson was transferred to Harris Academy Falconwood. The school's executive headteacher and head of school positions were abolished and Nicola Graham assumed the newly created position of principal. This year saw the establishment of a new free school on Chafford Hundred's site called Harris Primary Academy Mayflower. Mayflower moved to its own site in 2015. A year later, Nicola Graham became the executive principal of Harris Academy Chafford Hundred and appointed Ms L. Strong as her head of school. Another free school, Harris Academy Riverside, was launched in 2017. Nicola Graham became executive principal of Riverside and Chafford Hundred hosted it until its own building in Purfleet was completed in 2019. With this, the sixth form of Chafford Hundred stopped offering maths and science as options, where they were moved to Riverside.

In 2020 L. Strong was succeeded as head of school by Mr L. Glees. His position was renamed to head of academy. Heather Stannard succeeded Glees in the 2021/2022 academic year and her position was renamed to principal (although Nicola Graham remained executive principal). In 2022 she was succeeded by Mr B. Keely.

Premises

A new build. The building was intended to combine a nursery, primary, secondary and public library for the local area.  It was constructed by Nicholas Hare Architects and Crofton Consulting. The building is three storeys tall with three halls, a cafeteria, and over 50 classrooms including specialised ones for science, computing and DT. The two primary and secondary schools, and the sixth form, are all accessible by Mayflower Road. The library, once open to the public, has since been closed. Since opening the school has undergone two extensions.

Some time after, the sixth form was constructed by Bespoke Building Control at a value of £1.2m. It is a two-storey building with extra classrooms and a cafeteria.

Harris Academy Mayflower was built by Farrans Construction and FEH Commercial.

Headteachers and principals 
Chafford Hundred Campus Secondary School and Chafford Hundred Primary School originally operated de facto as one school with two co-headteachers: one for the primary school and one for the secondary school. Alison Banks presided over the secondary school between 2001 and 2004, serving alongside three primary school heads. They were Catherine Finn (2001 and 2002), Karen Lees (2003) and Ms Fergus (2004 onwards). Christopher Tomlinson was headteacher after Chafford Hundred Campus' separation from the primary school. He would later become the executive headteacher, maintaining this role after academisation. He then became the executive principal of other Harris academies, including Falconwood, Greenwich and Battersea. Nicola Graham became the head of school in 2012 and is the executive principal, serving since 2016. At Chafford Hundred, she has overseen the administration of Head of Schools L. Strong and L. Glees and Principal Heather Stannard. She is also the executive principal of Harris Academy Riverside and Harris Academy Rainham and "assists" Harris Academy Ockendon as the assistant director of the Southeast sector of the Harris Federation.

References

External links

Academies in Thurrock
Secondary schools in Thurrock
Chafford Hundred